Ripe or RIPE may refer to:

Horticulture
 Ripening, the maturation process of fruit
 Ripeness in viticulture, the completion of the ripening process of wine grapes

Acronyms
 RIPE, Réseaux IP Européens
 RIPE NCC, the Regional Internet Registry (RIR) for Europe 
 RIPEMD, a family of cryptographic hash functions
 Realizing Increased Photosynthetic Efficiency, a genetic engineering research project

Arts and entertainment
 Ripe (film), a 1997 American drama by Mo Ogrodnik
 Ripe (Banderas album), 1991
 Ripe (Ben Lee album) or the title song, 2007
 Ripe (Field Trip album), 1991
 Ripe (Slug album), 2015
 Ripe Digital Entertainment, a defunct American video-on-demand provider

Places
 Ripe, East Sussex, England
 Ripe, Marche, Italy

Other uses
 Ripeness, a term in law
 Wilhelm Ripe (1818–1885), German painter

See also
 Cervical ripening, the softening of the cervix prior to the onset of labor
 Ripen (album), by Shawn McDonald, 2006